Hamilton-Baillie is a family name.  Notable members include:

 Ben Hamilton-Baillie, architect and designer
 Brigadier Jock Hamilton-Baillie, persistent prison camp escaper and Colditz inmate

See also
 Baillie-Hamilton
 

Compound surnames
Surnames of Scottish origin